OpenGrok is a source code search and cross-reference engine. It helps programmers to search, cross-reference, and navigate source code trees to aid code comprehension.

It can understand various program file formats and version control histories like Monotone, SCCS, RCS, CVS, Subversion, Mercurial, Git, Clearcase, Perforce, and Bazaar.

The name comes from the term grok, a jargon term used in computing to mean "profoundly understand."

OpenGrok is being developed mainly by the community with the help of a few engineers from Oracle Corporation (which absorbed Sun Microsystems). OpenGrok is released under the terms of the Common Development and Distribution License (CDDL).

It is mainly written in Java, with some tooling done in Python. It relies on the analysis done by Ctags. There is an official Docker image available.

Features 
OpenGrok supports:
 Full text Search
 Definition Search
 Identifier Search
 Path search
 History Search
 Shows matching lines
 Hierarchical Search
 query syntax like AND, OR, field:
 Incremental update
 Syntax highlighting cross references (Xref)
 Quick navigation inside the file
 Interface for SCM
 Usable URLs
 Individual file download
 Changes at directory level
 Multi language support
 Suggester
 RESTful API

See also 
 LXR Cross Referencer
 ViewVC
 FishEye (software)

References

External links 
 
 OpenGrok demo site
 
 Super User's BSD Cross Reference

Code comprehension tools
Code navigation tools
Cross-platform free software
Free version control software
Source code
Java platform software
Concurrent Versions System
Apache Subversion
Code search engines